Rugby Club Sitges is a Spanish rugby team based in Sitges.

History
The team was founded in 1987.

Season to season

1 seasons in División de Honor B

External links
Official website

Sitges
Rugby clubs established in 1987
Rugby union teams in Catalonia
1987 establishments in Catalonia